Izquierdo is a crater on Mercury located to the east of Beagle Rupes and Sveinsdóttir crater. The floor of Izquierdo is smooth, the result of having been partially filled with volcanic lava. Circular outlines of the rims of “ghost craters” – smaller, older craters that have been largely buried by the lavas that infilled the basin – are visible in a few places on Izquierdo's floor. The remnants of a buried inner ring are also barely discernible in spots, and it is one of 110 peak ring basins on Mercury.  There have been more recent impacts into the floor of Izquierdo, resulting in some small, sharply defined craters.

Views

References

Impact craters on Mercury